Manitoba Provincial Road 344 is a very short provincial road in the Canadian province of Manitoba.

Route description 

The route begins at PTH 2 west of Wawanesa, and terminates at PR 340 in the village. The route is paved for its entire length.

History 

The current PR 344 was originally a small connector spur of what was a much longer north–south provincial road. In the early 1990s, the Manitoba government decommissioned a number of provincial secondary roads and returned the maintenance of these roads back to the rural municipalities. All of the original PR 344 other than the current route was included in this decommissioning.

Prior to this, PR 344 started at PTH 23 near Dunrea. Once within Brandon's city limits, PR 344 originally followed 17th Street East to Victoria Avenue East. The highway turned west on to Victoria Avenue and terminated at a junction with PTH 1A at 1st Street.

After the decommissioning of the original route, PR 340 was rerouted onto the former section of the highway between Treesbank and Wawanesa. As well, PR 453, which originally terminated eastbound at PR 344, was extended from its old terminus to PR 340 near Treesbank using the previous PR 344 route past the unincorporated community of Rounthwaite. The section of the former PR 344 between PTH 23 and PTH 2 and between PR 453 and Brandon are now municipal roads.

References

344